Alameda Council was one of the seven smallest BSA councils in the United States until 2020,  serving youth in the city of Alameda.  It was first organized in December 1916 and chartered in January 1917, shortly after the organization of BSA councils in Berkeley and Oakland, making it the third oldest BSA council in Northern California. It was one of six BSA councils that serve the San Francisco Bay area.

History

In 1916, a group of community leaders led by Barclay Stephens,  approached the Boy Scouts of America about having a council for their community. This occurred around the same time that the Oakland-Piedmont Council (#021) was chartered. The residents of Alameda felt that they should have their own council separate from Oakland. The council was founded with seven troops started in January 1917.

The council no longer had any camps of its own, having relinquished both leased properties (Cedarbrook and Stephens). Given its small size, the council has focused on its youth programs and developing adult leaders. One of these, the Order of the Solo Hiker, was a local award meant to honor dedicated volunteers.

Camps
 Camp Cedarbrook (closed 1999) - Long Barn 
 Camp Stephens (now Camp Oski operated by the CAA) - Pinecrest Lake

Order of the Arrow
The Kaweah Lodge of the Order of the Arrow was founded by council leaders in 1947 with the first OA members inducted at Camp McBride by members of Yo-Se-Mite Lodge #278.  The lodge continued for over 73 years of continuous service, until being folded into the new Yerba Buena Lodge of the new Golden Gate Area Council.

See also
 
 Scouting in California

References

Alameda, California
Boy Scout councils in California